"Lockjaw" is a song by American rapper French Montana featuring fellow American rapper Kodak Black. It was released on May 27, 2016, as a single in promotion of the former's mixtape MC4. It was also originally on his twentieth mixtape Wave Gods. The track was produced by Ben Billions and Yo Asel. The song is featured in the video game WWE 2K17. The song was certified Platinum by the Recording Industry Association of America (RIAA) in March 2017, for selling over 1,000,000 digital copies in the United States.

Music video
The song's accompanying music video premiered on June 9, 2016 on French Montana's Vevo account on YouTube. It was directed by SpiffTV. Since its release, the video has received over 100 million views on YouTube. Scenes were shot between Port-au-Prince, Haiti and Broward County, Florida.

Remix
The official remix features a newly additional verse by Gucci Mane. The second remix entitled "Clue Radio Remix" was released with DJ Clue featuring Jeezy, Rick Ross, DJ Khaled and the original Kodak Black.

Commercial performance
On the week of July 23, 2016, "Lockjaw" debuted at number 98 on the Billboard Hot 100, peaking at number 73 for two non-consecutive weeks, before leaving the chart after its appearance at number 99 the week of September 24. It reappeared at number 100 the week of October 8 but left the next week.
The song made its second re-entry at number 97 on the week of November 5, 2016, moved to number 96 the week after before leaving completely, spending thirteen weeks on the chart.

Weekly charts

Year-end charts

Certifications

Release history

References

2016 singles
2016 songs
French Montana songs
Songs written by French Montana
Kodak Black songs
Songs written by Kodak Black
Songs written by DJ Khaled
Songs written by Ben Billions
Epic Records singles